Michael Louis Vono (born September 15, 1948) was the ninth bishop of the Episcopal Diocese of Rio Grande.

Early life and education
Vono was born in Providence, Rhode Island on September 15, 1948 and was raised as a Roman Catholic. He studied for the catholic priesthood at Our Lady of Providence Seminary in Warwick, Rhode Island and earned a Bachelor of Arts. He then pursued studies at the Catholic University of America and graduated with a Master of Arts in religious and theological studies. After joining the Episcopal Church in 1974, he also resumed training for the priesthood and earned a certificate in Anglican Studies from the Virginia Theological Seminary in 1976. He was also awarded a Doctor of Ministry from Hartford Seminary.

Ordained ministry
Vono was ordained to the diaconate on June 26, 1976, and to the priesthood on February 12, 1977. He became assistant rector of All Saints Church in Worcester, Massachusetts before being called to Christ Church in Leicester, Massachusetts in 1980 to serve as its vicar. A month later, the mission church was made into a parish church and he became its first rector. In 1990, he took a sabbatical and went to Rome to spend time at the Anglican Center. In 1992 he accepted the post of rector of St. Paul's Within the Walls in Rome, Italy, where he remained until 2010.

Bishop
On April 24, 2010, Vono was elected on the third ballot as Bishop of the Rio Grande. He was consecrated on October 24, 2010 by Presiding Bishop Katharine Jefferts Schori at the Hilton Hotel in Albuquerque, New Mexico. He was then installed at St John's Cathedral on October 24.  He remained in office until his retirement on November 3, 2018.

See also
 List of Episcopal bishops of the United States
 Historical list of the Episcopal bishops of the United States

References

1948 births
Living people
American Episcopalians
Episcopal bishops of the Rio Grande
Catholic University of America alumni
Converts to Anglicanism from Roman Catholicism